is a polymer chemist known for his work in the fields of supramolecular chemistry, materials chemistry and polymer chemistry. Aida, who is the Deputy Director for the RIKEN Center for Emergent Matter Science (CEMS) and a Distinguished University Professor at the University of Tokyo, has made pioneering contributions to the initiation, fundamental progress, and conceptual expansion of supramolecular polymerization. Aida has also been a leader and advocate for addressing critical environmental issues caused by plastic waste and microplastics in the oceans, soil, and food supply, through the development of dynamic, responsive, healable, reorganizable, and adaptive supramolecular polymers and related soft materials.

Education 
Aida received his Bachelor of Engineering in Colloidal Science at the Yokohama National University in 1979, before moving to the University of Tokyo for his Master of Engineering (1981) and Doctor of Engineering (1984) degrees in Polymer Chemistry. He was awarded the Inoue Research Award for Young Scientists for his doctoral work, with the thesis title of "Controlled Polymerization by Metalloporphyrins" under the supervision of Professor Shohei Inoue.

Career 
After completing his doctoral studies, Aida was immediately appointed as an Assistant Professor in the Department of Synthetic Chemistry at the University of Tokyo. At the beginning of his research career, he worked on the development of precision macromolecular synthesis using metalloporphyrin complexes. In 1986, he was a visiting scholar at the IBM Almaden Research Center. Aida was promoted to the position of Lecturer in 1989 and Associate Professor in 1991, before being installed as a full professor in the Department of Chemistry and Biotechnology at the University of Tokyo in 1996. In 2022 he was appointed as a Distinguished University Professor at the University of Tokyo.

From 1996 to 1999, Aida served as a researcher in the Japan Science and Technology Agency (JST) PRESTO Fields and Reactions Project. Aida was appointed as a visiting Visiting Professor at the Institute for Molecular Science, Okazaki, from 1999 to 2001. He served as the director for the JST ERATO AIDA Nanospace Project from 2000 to 2005 and the JST ERATO–SORST Electronic Nanospace Project from 2005 to 2010. Aida served as the director of the RIKEN Advanced Science Institute from 2008 to 2012. Since 2013 he has been a Deputy Director of the RIKEN Center for Emergent Matter Science (CEMS).

Contributions to research 
Aida’s research focuses on supramolecular systems with unique properties and functions. Aida is recognized for his pioneering contributions to the emergence and progress of supramolecular polymerization. He reported the first example of this non-covalent polymerization by designing an amphiphilic porphyrin that spontaneously forms a 1D cofacial assembly in water as a prototype supramolecular polymer. Then, he non-covalently achieved (1) nanotubular polymerization, (2) living chain-growth (ring-opening) polymerization, (3) block copolymerization, (4) stereoselective polymerization, and (5) thermally bisignate polymerization. He has also made fundamental contributions in expanding the scope of supramolecular polymerization to include chain propagations in two and three dimensions. His works have challenged preconceptions in the field of supramolecular chemistry, connected gaps between conventional and supramolecular polymerizations and realized properties unachievable through conventional polymerization. In addition to fundamental contributions to the understanding of supramolecular systems, he has promoted their widespread use by developing materials for a wide range of applications. Aida has published several review articles on the historical background and progress of supramolecular polymerization: (1) Aida, Meijer, and Stupp, (2) Aida and Meijer, and (3) Hashim, Bergueiro, Meijer, and Aida.

In 1988, while working on the development of polymerization catalysts as a non-independent assistant professor, Aida published a prototype of supramolecular polymerization, based on his finding of a catalytic version of living polymerization, named "immortal polymerization". He utilized immortal polymerization to synthesize oligo(ethylene glycol)-appended amphiphilic porphyrin and confirmed its 1D assembly in aqueous media. In addition to this pioneering contribution to supramolecular polymerization, he made an early seminal discovery of extrusion polymerization within catalyst-immobilized mesoporous silica, affording extended-chain crystalline polyethylene fibers. He was also the first to discover morphology-dependent energy funneling in photoexcited dendrimers.

After being promoted to full professor, Aida revisited his work on supramolecular polymerization and demonstrated the first homochiral (chiral self-sorting) supramolecular polymerization using a cyclic peptide motif as the chiral monomer. He also synthesized an amphiphilic version of hexabenzocoronene, a "molecular graphene”, and succeeded in its supramolecular nanotubular polymerization, obtaining the first electroconductive supramolecular nanotube. He then utilized this nanographene platform to obtain radial and linear supramolecular block copolymers. The resulting block copolymers were designed to include donor/acceptor heterojunctions and displayed photophysical properties. This series of pioneering works challenged the preconception that supramolecular polymers are only 1D dynamic aggregates with poor structural integrity. Aida also found that the supramolecular polymerization of chiral amphiphilic hexabenzocoronenes proceeds in a one-handed helical manner via the majority rule. This work was further extended to the development of a redox-active oligo(o-phenylene) helix and, together with Professor Minghua Liu of the Chinese Academy of Sciences, mirror-symmetry broken helical fibers consisting of an achiral component that serve as a chiral scaffold for transition metal-catalyzed asymmetric reactions. In 2014, Aida obtained a metal-organic nanotube by the supramolecular polymerization of a redox-active ferrocene-cored double-decker tetrapyridyl monomer and demonstrated that this nanotube, upon oxidation, can be cut into gigantic nanorings, which can then be pasted on a negatively charged mica substrate or assembled coaxially to recover the original nanotube upon reduction.

In 2015, Aida realized the first example of chain-growth supramolecular polymerization, where a bowl-shaped, corannulene-based monomer, rendered non-polymerizable by an intramolecular hydrogen-bonding network, is forced to polymerize by the action of a corresponding initiator that can reorganize the intramolecular hydrogen-bonding network into an intermolecular one. The polymer molecular weight is uniform and tunable by changing the monomer-to-initiator mole ratio. Furthermore, sequential polymerization of two monomers with this system leads to well-defined block copolymers. The chain growth is also perfectly homochiral, even when a racemic chiral monomer is polymerized. When one enantiomer of a properly designed chiral initiator is used for the polymerization, only the monomer with the preferred enantiomeric form polymerizes, resulting in 100% enantiomeric separation of the racemic monomer. These achievements challenged the notion that supramolecular polymerization always follows a step-growth mechanism and revealed the potential of supramolecular polymerization as a tool for precision macromolecular synthesis.

In 2017, Aida reported a conceptually new, "thermally bisignate", supramolecular polymerization, where supramolecular polymers are designed in such a way that they form upon heating as well as cooling but disappear at temperatures in between. This work challenged the preconception that supramolecular polymers are more stable at lower temperatures, while they readily dissociate upon heating, unveiling new insights into the dynamic nature of supramolecular polymers. One of the most energy-demanding and costly processes in macromolecular engineering is solution processing, as polymer solutions are viscous due to chain entanglement. Thermally bisignate supramolecular polymerization has the potential to solve this universal issue in macromolecular engineering.

In 2021, Aida reported the solvent-free autocatalytic supramolecular polymerization of phthalocyanines, where the cross section of the end of the propagating chain serves as a template to catalyze the conversion of phthalonitriles into phthalocyanines in an exceptionally high yield of over 80%. Solvent-free chemical synthesis and autocatalysis are important green technology concepts for sustainable materials.

Aida has made significant contributions to filling the gap between supramolecular and conventional (covalent) polymerizations and inspired the field through the development of a variety of innovative materials by expansion of the basic concept of supramolecular polymerization. Representative examples include 

(1) "bucky gels", carbon nanotubes physically crosslinked by ionic liquids and the use of this technology for graphite exfoliation to graphene, and the fabrication of the first metal-free stretchable electronics and battery-driven dry actuators for manufacturing mobile Braille devices

(2) "aqua materials", highly water-rich (organic content of 0.1–0.2% for ultralow dependency on fossil resources) hydrogels anomalously having significant mechanical robustness or geometrical anisotropy 

(3) ATP-responsive nanotubular carriers composed of chaperonin proteins, a biomolecular machine 

(4) non-crosslinked photoactuators 

(5) ferroelectric columnar liquid crystals 

(6) mechanically robust yet self-healable polymer glass 

(7) self-healable high-temperature porous organic materials 

(8) optoelectrically rewritable core-shell columnar liquid crystals with an AND logic gate operation 

(9) an elastic metal–organic crystal with a densely catenated backbone

(10) densely fluorinated nanochannels with ultrafast water permeation and salt rejection, formed by the stacking of macrocycles

His mechanically robust polymer glass which is self-healable at ambient temperatures, poly(ether thiourea), is notable as it dispelled a long-term preconception that mechanical robustness and self-healing abilities of polymers are mutually exclusive. Poly(ether thiourea) shows excellent mechanical robustness (Young's modulus E = 1.4 GPa) due to the dense, non-linear hydrogen-bonding network formed among thiourea groups, even though the molecular weight is relatively small (Mn = ~10,000 (g/mol)). Aida presented this concept at the World Economic Forum (Davos, 2019) as a promising example of sustainable materials.

In addition to his pioneering contribution to the field of supramolecular polymerization, he published seminal papers on photo-driven chiral molecular pincers that can deform guest molecules using light, subnanoscale hydrophobic modulation of salt bridges in aqueous media, and the first carbon nitride thin film.

Aida currently oversees a group of students and researchers with a diversity of research projects in his labs at the University of Tokyo and at the RIKEN Center for Emergent Matter Science (CEMS). Current research in the Aida Lab focuses on the design and application of supramolecular materials, including supramolecular polymers and gels, liquid crystals, and biomolecular assemblies.

Achievements and awards
Scientific output and professional service

Aida has published over 400 peer-reviewed research papers, review articles, and books, and more than 90 of his former group members now hold tenured academic positions worldwide.

Aida has served on the Board of Reviewing Editors for Science Magazine (since 2009), on the Advisory Board for the Journal of the American Chemical Society (2014–2021), and as Associate Editor for the Journal of Materials Chemistry (2004–2006). He has further served on the international advisory boards of over 15 journals, including executive advisory board for Giant.

He has served as a technical advisor for KAO Co. Ltd. (since 2017) and for Mitsui Chemical (2010–2015). He serves as a Member of the Scientific Advisory Board of the Max Planck Institute for Polymer Research (since 2020) and as an International Academic Advancement Council Member for the South China Advanced Institute for Soft Matter Science and Technology (AISMST) (since 2017). Aida was a member of the International Advisory Committee of the Institute of Molecular Functional Materials of the University of Hong Kong (2010–2018). He also served on the International Advisory Board of the International Center for Materials Nanoarchitectonics at the National Institute for Materials Science, Japan (2007–2017).

Academic invitations and memberships

Aida has been invited to give lectures at many universities and conferences. He has been, amongst others, Rohm & Haas Lecturer (Berkeley, 2007), Annual Bayer Lecture series Lecturer (Pittsburgh, 2009; Texas A&M, 2012), Stephanie Kwolek Lecturer in Materials Chemistry (Carnegie Mellon University, 2009), Merck-Pfister Lecturer in Organic Chemistry (MIT, 2010), Novartis Seminar in Organic Chemistry lecturer, (University of Illinois, 2010), Toray Advanced Materials Symposium lecturer (Japan, 2011), Torkil Holm Symposium Lecturer (Denmark, 2012), Danish Chemical Society Opening Plenary Lecturer (Denmark, 2012), International Institute for Nanotechnology Symposium lecturer (Northwestern University, 2012), Van’t Hoff Award Lecturer (The Netherlands, 2013), Schmidt Lecturer (Weizmann Institute of Science, Israel, 2016), Melville Lecturer (Cambridge, UK, 2017), Xuetang Lecturer (Tsinghua University, China, 2017), Peter Timms Lecturer (Bristol, UK, 2018), Master Distinguished Lecturer (Shanghai Jiao Tong University, China, 2019), and Dodge Lecturer (Yale University, 2021). Aida has given a number of lectures at Gordon Research Conferences (Self-Assembly and Supramolecular Chemistry, 2013, 2019; Artificial Molecular Switches & Motors, 2015, 2017; Bioinspired Materials, 2018). He served as Chair of the Gordon Research Conference on Self-Assembly and Supramolecular Chemistry in 2017. He gave lectures at the Molecular Machines Nobel Prize Conference (Netherlands, 2017) and at the Wolf Prize Symposium (Israel, 2018), as well as the opening keynote lecture at the ACS Spring 2021 Meeting.

Aida has been an Honorary Fellow of the Indian Chemical Society (since 2013). He received a Senior Visiting Scholarship from State Key Laboratory, Fudan University (since 2018). He was elected a foreign member of the Royal Netherlands Academy of Arts and Sciences in 2020.

Aida was elected into the National Academy of Engineering in 2021 for contributions to the engineering of smart and adaptive molecular materials using physical perturbation of multivalent interactions.

Awards

Aida has received numerous prominent awards, including the Chemical Society of Japan Award for Young Chemists (1988), the Society of Polymer Science Japan Award (1992), SPACC Award (1998), Wiley Polymer Chemistry Award (1999), IBM Science Award (1999), The Nagoya Medal of Organic Chemistry: Silver Medal (2000), Tokyo Techno Forum Award: Gold Medal (2001), Inoue Prize for Science (2005), Molecular Chirality Award (2008), Coordination Chemistry Award (2008), The Chemical Society of Japan Award (2008), The American Chemical Society Award in Polymer Chemistry (2009),  Medal with Purple Ribbon (2010), Alexander von Humboldt Research Award (2011), Fujihara Award (2011), American Chemical Society Arthur K. Doolittle Award (PMSE, 2012), van't Hoff Award Lecture (2013), Leo Esaki Prize (2015), the Chirality Medal (2017), Japan Academy Prize (2018), Global Outstanding Student and Mentor Award in Polymer Science and Engineering (2018), Ichimura Prize in Science for Excellent Achievement (2020), Ryoji Noyori ACES Award (2021), and the Netherlands Award for Supramolecular Chemistry (2021).

Personal life
In his student days, Aida enjoyed mountain climbing, and playing basketball and tennis. He now enjoys Japanese hot springs, travelling, animals, especially cats, and playing electric saxophone (Roland Aerophone AE-10).

References

External links 
 Aida Research Group
 RIKEN Center for Emergent Matter Science Emergent Soft Matter Function Research Group
 University of Tokyo Department of Chemistry and Biotechnology
 University of Tokyo profile

Japanese nanotechnologists
Japanese scientists
Members of the Royal Netherlands Academy of Arts and Sciences
Academic staff of the University of Tokyo
University of Tokyo alumni
Living people
1956 births